The Fallbach is a small river in Tyrol, Austria, a tributary of the Inn. The Fallbach lies in full in Innsbruck's city area. It should not be confused with the similarly-named river, a left Inn tributary in Baumkirchen.

It runs straight in southern direction to  where it merges with the Inn.

This often causes locally low water levels in the Fallbach.

Rivers of Tyrol (state)
Rivers of Austria